Nycteola frigidana, known generally as the frigid owlet or frigid midget, is a species of nolid moth in the family Nolidae. It is found in North America.

The MONA or Hodges number for Nycteola frigidana is 8975.

References

Further reading

 
 
 

Chloephorinae
Articles created by Qbugbot
Moths described in 1863